Ellispet is a small village near Erode, Tamil Nadu, India. The village is named after a Christian missionary Ellis. This village was created by settling a small number of families during British India period as a settlement of early Christians.

History
Ellispet (called as Ellispettai)  used to be known as "Ottagamedu" means "camel mound". There was a rock in the East of the village that looked like a camel sitting with its head raised.  During early 19th century, due to rare human presence, it was a place for robbers, who robbed the travelers in an ambush that passed by the area in bullock cart . Shikakai also known as Acacia concinna trees grow very well here. The branches of Shikakai tree create unusual sounds when the wind blows through them that used to scare people. It is the way to Sathyamangalam from Erode.

Ellispet was named after Ellis, a foreigner who settled World War I veterans, each of whom were given 4 acres of farmland and a residential plot, which is irrigated by Bhavanisagar alternative canal projects.  It was a barren land without any irrigation system, but after the initiatives from government officials, the land is watered with a canal called Rettai Vaaikaal.

Ellispet has a population of approximately 3,000 people. Well cultivated area for doing agriculture from the dam LBP Bhavanisagar.

While Tamil is the main language in the village, Hindi is also spoken by the majority of ex-service men and laborers working in the steel factories. English is also spoken widely by the foreign students studying in the nearby colleges.

Transportation
Ellispet is located on the highway, which goes to Mysore from Erode. Tamil Nadu State Transport Corporation operates route no 7, 7C,7B,B2,44  from Erode to Kavandapadi. Other than these, all the route buses and private buses will stop in this village. Between Chithode to Kavandapadi all the nearby villages can get the buses from Ellispet. There are four bus stops for this village, Rattai Vaikaal, Ellispet, Mettu Kadai, and Therkathu Vaikaal. Other than the highway, a road goes through the village to Kanjikoil, called Kanjikoil Road.

Schools
Tamil Medium CSI Elementary school is the only school: it provides instruction up to 5th grade. High school students travel to nearest places, which are, Chithode, Kavandapadi, and Kanjikoil. 

An arts and science college in Ellispet, Bharathidasan Arts and Science College, accommodates students from all over the world. An English medium orphanage school, called "Anbin Ootru", is also available near Therkathu vaaikkaal.

Strategically Chess Academy located in middle of Ellispettai provides Chess Education to students Across INDIA via online & Offline.

Industry
Cast India, which is exporters of all types of aluminum scraps.

Religion
Almost 98% of the population follows Christianity and there is no Hindu temple or Muslim mosque in this village. There are two Christian churches, one is Church of South India (CSI)directed by Ellispet postrate and another one is a Pentecostal church founded by Yasu Manoharan.

Festivals
Christmas is celebrated widely with the houses newly painted and the sports events conducted.

Medical facilities
There is no hospital in the village.

References

Villages in Erode district